John Hartshorne (25 March 1907 – 1971) was an English footballer who made 91 appearances in the Football League for Lincoln City, 100 appearances in all competitions, before moving back into non-league football with Grantham and Boston United. He played as a right back.

Career statistics
Source:

References

1907 births
1971 deaths
People from Willenhall
English footballers
Association football fullbacks
Stoke City F.C. players
Macclesfield Town F.C. players
Lincoln City F.C. players
Grantham Town F.C. players
Boston United F.C. players
English Football League players
Midland Football League players